Wilbur Maurice Harris (born February 21, 1976), nicknamed "Sugar Moe", is the former United States Boxing Association heavyweight champion. A professional competitor since 1992, he holds notable victories over Siarhei Liakhovich, David Izon, James Thunder, and Jeremy Williams. As a professional, Harris also faced world champions and contenders Larry Holmes, Vaughn Bean, Derrick Jefferson, Chris Byrd, Henry Akinwande, Fres Oquendo, Tony Thompson, Kubrat Pulev, Amir Mansour, Alexander Ustinov, and Albert Sosnowski.

Professional career
Maurice Harris turned pro at 16 as a light heavyweight in 1992, and faced many up-and-coming prospects and comebacking champions. In his early professional years, he lost to future number one contender Vaughn Bean, and defeated 18-0-0 David Izon.

In 1992, Harris lost a 12-round decision in his first attempt to win the vacant United States Boxing Association (USBA) heavyweight title against future world heavyweight champion Chris Byrd.

In 1997 he lost a disputed split decision to former champion Larry Holmes. He followed the Holmes bout with a seven fight winning streak in 1998-99. This included defeating former number one heavyweight contender Jeremy Williams, and culminated in a fight on HBO with Derrick Jefferson. In what was labeled as the 1999 Ring Magazine knockout of the year, Harris was brutally knocked out by a vicious left hook.

In 1998 Harris was the chief sparring partner for heavyweight world champion Lennox Lewis and maintained this position for several years.

In 2002, Harris knocked out future heavyweight champion 19-0 Siarhei Liakhovich in the 9th round. Later that year, Harris won the Thunderbox Heavyweight Tournament "Fistful of Dollars" in Atlantic City, New Jersey. The round-robin exhibition event consisted of eight heavyweights doing battle in three, three-minute rounds. Harris outpointed Gerald Nobles, future number one contender Tony Thompson and Israel Garcia in the same evening to win the $100,000 purse.

Comeback
After a three-year layoff, Harris made a comeback in 2010 in the heavyweight division.  Under the guidance of promoter Mario Yagobi of Boxing360, Harris returned to the ring. Harris won the vacant United States Boxing Association heavyweight title in his second opportunity with a 12-round unanimous decision over Nagy Aguilera at the Grand Casino in Hinckley, Minnesota. However, on May 27, 2011, Harris lost an eliminator bout for the IBF # 2 position at Reno Events Center in Reno, Nevada. On July 16, 2011, Harris defended his USBA heavyweight title in Atlantic City, New Jersey on July 16, 2011, with a 12th-round knockout over challenger Derric Rossy.

Professional boxing record

External links
 
Maurice Harris - Boxing360 Biography, Boxing
USBA Heavyweight Champion Maurice Harris on Brink of Living his Dream, April 28, 2011

References

1976 births
Living people
Sportspeople from East Orange, New Jersey
Boxers from New Jersey
African-American boxers
Heavyweight boxers
American male boxers
21st-century African-American sportspeople
20th-century African-American sportspeople